The Grand Race around Lake Viljandi is an annual cross country running competition that takes place around the Lake Viljandi in Viljandi, Estonia. It is also the oldest traditional running event in Estonia and has been organized already since 1928. It is held annually at 1 May. The history of the race goes back to an idea of a schoolteacher T. Andresson.

Past senior race winners

Key:

References

External links
Official website

Cross country running competitions
Viljandi
Athletics competitions in Estonia
Cross country running in Estonia
Annual sporting events in Estonia
1928 establishments in Estonia
Recurring sporting events established in 1928
Spring (season) events in Estonia